Tiefenbach is a former municipality in the district of Mittweida, in Saxony, Germany. It was formed in 1994 by the merger of the former municipalities  Arnsdorf, Böhrigen, Dittersdorf, Etzdorf, Marbach and Naundorf. On 1 July 2008 Tiefenbach was absorbed into Striegistal.

References

Former municipalities in Saxony
Mittelsachsen